Ferdinand Alfred Friedrich Jodl (28 November 1896 – 9 June 1956) was a German general during World War II who commanded the Mountain Corps Norway during the Petsamo–Kirkenes Offensive. He was the younger brother of Alfred Jodl, Chief of the Operations Staff of the OKW.

Life and career
Ferdinand Jodl entered the German Army in August 1914 as an ensign, serving as a Lieutenant in a Bavarian Field Artillery Regiment from 1915 until the end of World War I. He remained in the army after 1918, becoming a general staff officer. In this capacity he served with XII Corps in the early part of World War II, then moving to XXXXIX Mountain Corps. From 1942 he served in Finland and North Norway, first as chief of staff of the 20th Mountain Army, then as commander of the XIX Mountain Corps, receiving the Knight's Cross of the Iron Cross for his command of this corps in January 1945. He ended the war as commander of German forces in North Norway, grouped under the name Army Detachment Narvik, having attained the rank of General of Mountain Troops. 

Ferdinand Jodl died in Essen on 9 June 1956, aged 59 and was buried on Frauenchiemsee in Bavaria.

Awards and decorations

 Knight's Cross of the Iron Cross on 13 January 1945 as General der Gebirgstruppe and commander of XIX. Gebirgskorps

References

Citations

Bibliography

 

1896 births
1956 deaths
People from Landau
People from the Palatinate (region)
German Army personnel of World War I
Generals of Mountain Troops
Recipients of the clasp to the Iron Cross, 1st class
Recipients of the Gold German Cross
Recipients of the Knight's Cross of the Iron Cross
Recipients of the Order of the Cross of Liberty, 1st Class
Recipients of the Order of the Crown of King Zvonimir
Reichswehr personnel
German prisoners of war in World War II held by the United Kingdom
Military personnel from Bavaria
20th-century Freikorps personnel